Black Magic Night: Live at the Royal Festival Hall is a live double album by British Afro rock band Osibisa recorded at the Royal Festival Hall on 19 July 1977 with live versions of songs from their previous albums. Released in 1977 by Bronze Records (BRON 506) and reissued as 2-CD set in 1993 on CD format by Castle Communications (CBC 8046).

Track listing

Personnel
Teddy Osei – tenor and soprano saxophones, flute, African drums, lead vocals 
Mac Tontoh – trumpet, flugelhorn, kabassa, bells, rattles, African xylophone, vocals 
Sol (Rhythm Man) Amarfio – drums, cowbells, congas, vocals 
Wendell Richardson – guitars, Dondo drum, lead vocals
Mike Odumosu – bass guitar, bells, vocals
Robert Bailey – keyboards
Daku (Potato) Adams – congas, percussion
Sonia Lekhela – backing vocals
Ntobi Mdudu – backing vocals
Tiny Conco – backing vocals
Linda Conco – backing vocals

Production
Recorded at the Royal Festival Hall, London on 19 July 1977 with the Rolling Stones Mobile Studio 
Mixed at the Roundhouse Recording Studio, London
Produced by Gerry Bron
Engineered by Ashley Howe
P.A. Mix by Tony Meape
Photography by Steve Lewis
Art Direction by Paul Bevoir
Cover by David Shortt
Artwork by Leaderline Artists
Compilation Remastering by Robert M. Corich and John Dawson Reed

References
All information gathered from back cover album  Black Magic Night: Live at the Royal Festival Hall (Copyright © 1977 Bronze Records (BRON 506).
Allmusic  
Discogs  

1977 live albums
Osibisa albums
albums produced by Gerry Bron
Bronze Records live albums
Albums recorded at the Royal Festival Hall